Seán Kyne (born 16 May 1975) is an Irish Fine Gael politician who has been a Senator for the Cultural and Educational Panel since March 2020, and previously from February 2020 to March 2020, after being nominated by the Taoiseach. He served as a Minister of State from 2016 to 2020, including as Government Chief Whip from 2018 to 2020. He served as a Teachta Dála (TD) for the Galway West constituency from 2011 to 2020.

Personal life
Kyne is from Moycullen, County Galway. He attended St Mary's College, Galway, then NUI Galway and University College Dublin, studying agricultural science in both (primary degree in Galway and master's degree in Dublin).

Politics
At the 2004 local elections, he was elected to Galway County Council for the Connemara local electoral area. He was re-elected to Galway County Council in 2009, having unsuccessfully contested Galway West at the 2007 general election. He was also unsuccessful at the 2007 election to the 23rd Seanad, when he stood for the Agricultural Panel.

His election in Galway West was the last result to be declared at the 2011 general election. Kyne was ahead of Independent candidate Catherine Connolly by a margin of 17 votes. Connolly sought a full recount, which concluded after a total of four days of counting but did not change the outcome. His victory gave Fine Gael two seats in Galway West for the first time since 1982. He was re-elected at the 2016 general election.

On 19 May 2016, he was appointed as Minister of State with responsibility for Gaeltacht Affairs and Natural Resources by the new minority government of Fine Gael and Independents led by Enda Kenny. He served until Kenny resigned as Taoiseach on 14 June 2017.

On 20 June 2017, he was appointed as Minister of State for Natural Resources, Community Affairs and Digital Development by the minority government led by Leo Varadkar. Following a cabinet reshuffle on 11 October 2018, he was appointed by the government as Government Chief Whip and Minister of State for Gaeilge, the Gaeltacht and the Islands.

He lost his seat at the 2020 general election. He was nominated to the Seanad by Taoiseach Leo Varadkar, to fill a vacancy caused by the election of Frank Feighan to the Dáil. On 31 March 2020, Kyne was elected to Seanad Éireann at the 2020 election on the Cultural and Educational Panel. He continued to serve as Minister of State until the formation of a new government on 27 June 2020.

References

External links

Seán Kyne's page on the Fine Gael website

1975 births
Living people
Alumni of the University of Galway
Alumni of University College Dublin
Fine Gael TDs
Local councillors in County Galway
Members of the 31st Dáil
Members of the 32nd Dáil
Ministers of State of the 32nd Dáil
Politicians from County Galway
Government Chief Whip (Ireland)
Nominated members of Seanad Éireann
Members of the 26th Seanad
Members of the 25th Seanad
Fine Gael senators